María Clemecia "Tutina" Rodríguez de Santos (born María Clemencia Rodríguez Múnera, 13 November 1955) is the wife of the 32nd president of Colombia, Juan Manuel Santos Calderón, and served as First Lady of Colombia until August 2018.

She is also known for being one of the most influent Fashion icons in Colombia.

Personal life
María Clemencia was born on 13 November 1955 in Bucaramanga, Santander to Jorge Rodríguez Rodríguez and his wife Cecilia Múnera Cambas. She is the sixth of eight children.

On 11 December 1982 she married Christian Toro Ibler, a respected and well known Colombian publicist, in a Roman Catholic ceremony that took place at the Church of Our Lady of the Waters in Bogotá officiated by Fr Jesús Adán Londoño Rodas and attended by, among others, the then-President Belisario Betancur Cuartas and First Lady Rosa Helena Álvarez Yepes who were not only the guests of honour, but also the godparents of the couple for the ceremony. The marriage however, did not last long and the couple divorced shortly after.

In 1987 she married Juan Manuel Santos Calderón, then Deputy Director of El Tiempo, this time in a civil ceremony.

Honours

Foreign honours
 :
 Grand Cross of the Order of Prince Henry (13 November 2017)
 Grand Cross of the Order of Merit (14 November 2012)
 :
 Dame Grand Cross of the Order of Isabella the Catholic (27 February 2015)

Dynastic honours
 Two Sicilian Royal Family:
 Dame Grand Cross of the Two Sicilian Royal Sacred Military Constantinian Order of Saint George, Special Class (7 June 2013)

See also
 Lorenza Villegas Restrepo

References

1955 births
Living people
First ladies of Colombia
Colombian graphic designers
Social Party of National Unity politicians
Colombian Roman Catholics
Santos family
Recipients of the Order of Isabella the Catholic
Dames Grand Cross of the Order of Isabella the Catholic
People from Bucaramanga